La Caraba is a 1947 Argentine film.

Cast
 Olinda Bozán
 Francisco Alvarez
 Armando Bó
 Lidia Denis
 Enrique Roldán
 Perla Mux
 Ángel Walk
 Arturo Arcari
 Arsenio Perdiguero
 Mavi Correa
 María Esther Corán
 Mario Baroffio
 R. A. Laborde

Production
 Director: Julio Saraceni
 Script: Emilio Villalba Welsh y Alejandro Verbitsky after Pedro Muñoz Seca
 Photography: Gumer Barreiros y Antonio Prieto (II)
 Montaje: José Cañizares
 Music: Gregory Stone
 Stage: Germen Gelpi

External links
 

1947 films
1940s Spanish-language films
Argentine black-and-white films
Films based on works by Pedro Muñoz Seca
1940s Argentine films